Jiaqiang Ban is a type of classes which are held  by Taiwanese middle school after school or on weekends, aiming at increasing the enrollment rate  of the school. These classes are banned by the Ministry of Education of Taiwan. The students that take part in these classes are those who have got high grades at school.

See also
Buxiban

References

Education in Taiwan
Secondary education by country